The king of hearts is a playing card in the standard 52-card deck.

King of Hearts may also refer to:

Games 
 The King of Hearts Has Five Sons, card game that may have been a precursor to Cluedo

Books
 King of Hearts (Alice's Adventures in Wonderland), a character from Lewis Carroll's book Alice's Adventures in Wonderland
 King of Hearts, a biography by G. Wayne Miller

Film and television
 King of Hearts (1936 film), a film by Oswald Mitchell and Walter Tennyson
 King of Hearts (1947 film)
 King of Hearts (1966 film) or Le Roi de coeur, a French film by Philippe de Broca
 King of Hearts (1968 film), an Iranian movie starring Mohammad-Ali Fardin
 King of Hearts, a title used by Domon Kasshu and Master Asia, part of the Shuffle Alliance, in Mobile Fighter G Gundam
 Jamai Raja (TV series), an Indian television series renamed King of Hearts for English viewers

Music
 King of Hearts (French band), a French rock band
 "King of Hearts" (song), 2012 song by Cassie

Albums
 King of Hearts (Roy Orbison album), 1992
 King of Hearts (Rick Vito album), 1992
 King of Hearts (King Ernest Baker album), 1998
 King of Hearts (Camu Tao album), 2010
 King of Hearts (Lloyd album),2011
 King of Hearts, the soundtrack for the 1966 film composed by Georges Delerue

Theater
 King of Hearts (musical), a 1978 Broadway musical with music by Peter Link 
 King of Hearts (1954 play), a play by Jean Kerr and Eleanor Brooke
 King of Hearts (2007 play), a satire by Alistair Beaton

See also

 or 

 King of Clubs (disambiguation)
 King of Diamonds (disambiguation)
 King of Spades (disambiguation)
 Knave of Hearts (disambiguation)
 Jack of Hearts (disambiguation)
 Queen of Hearts (disambiguation)
 Ace of Hearts (disambiguation)
 Kingdom of Hearts, a video game series